The 1939 All-Ireland Senior Camogie Championship Final was the eighth All-Ireland Final and the deciding match of the 1939 All-Ireland Senior Camogie Championship, an inter-county camogie tournament for the top teams in Ireland.

Cork had an easy win over the inexperienced Galway team.

References

All-Ireland Senior Camogie Championship Final
All-Ireland Senior Camogie Championship Final, 1939
All-Ireland Senior Camogie Championship Final
All-Ireland Senior Camogie Championship Finals
Cork county camogie team matches